The Las Vegas Park Speedway was a horse and automobile racing facility in Las Vegas, Nevada. It was built to be a horse racing facility and it held single races in NASCAR Grand National Series, AAA, and USAC Stock cars before it was demolished. It opened as the Las Vegas Jockey Club.

History

Construction
Joseph M. Smoot hitched a ride from lawyer Hank Greenspun to get from New York City to Las Vegas. He claimed to have helped build tracks in California and Florida which turned out to be untrue. The track was built to be a major horse racing facility on the south side of Las Vegas. Smoot funded the track by convincing 8000 shareholders to give him $2 million. "Old Joe knew a track wouldn't have a chance and he said so when he came here in 1946,"  Greenspun later said in his biography. After the construction was delayed well past its original opening date, Smoot published an apology in a local newspaper. Smoot and two others were charged with felony embezzlement after he could not provide receipts for missing $500,000. A trustee was appointed by a federal judge to run the track. Smoot remained indicted until he was found dead in a hotel room two years later.

Horse racing
On September 4, 1953 the track was opened named the Las Vegas Jockey Club. Ticket booths and tote boards did not work properly and only one entrance discouraged customers. Customers had to wait one hour in traffic to park and some went home without attending. 8200 customers attended in the first day and the board of directors closed the track for two weeks after the third day to replace the ticket booths. The track was rapidly losing money, so the board closed after operating 13 days. It opened back up in 1954 to host quarter horse racing but closed after seven weeks.

Auto Races
Three major auto racing event were held on the track. In 1954, an American Automobile Association (AAA) Champ Car event was held at the track, followed by a 1955 NASCAR Grand National race. The final race was a United States Auto Club (USAC) Stock Car event in 1959.

Championship car
The American Automobile Association held its final Indy Car race of the 1954 season on November 14. The  event was won by season champion Jimmy Bryan. 16 cars started the race and six of them were unable to return after being involved in a second lap wreck.

Championship car results

Jimmy Bryan
Manny Ayulo
Jimmy Davies
Rodger Ward
Andy Linden
Tommy Hinnershitz
Rex Easton
Chuck Weyant
Pat O'Connor
Larry Crockett
Roy Prosser
Johnnie Tolan
Johnny Boyd
Bob Sweikert
Bob Carroll
Cal Niday
Tony Bettenhausen
Danny Oakes

NASCAR
The track's only NASCAR event was held at the 1-mile dirt track on October 16, 1955. The 43rd event for the season was scheduled for 200 laps. The race was won by three-time USAC stock car champion Norm Nelson after darkness shorted the event to 111 laps; it was his only NASCAR win. He led the final 106 laps in a Chrysler owned by 1955 championship owner Carl Kiekhaefer.  Nelson won the race by two laps.

NASCAR results

Norm Nelson
Bill Hyde
Bill West
Sherman Clark
Jim Murray
Bob Ruppert
Johnny Mantz
Bill Stammer
Ernie Young
Bob Stanclift
Tom Francis
Fred Steinbroner
Herb Crawford
Danny Letner
John Lansaw
Allen Adkins
John Kieper
Ed Brown
Herb Hill
Virgil Martin
Eddie Pagan
Erick Erickson
Clyde Palmer
Bill Amick
Carl Hoover
Lloyd Dane
Britton Jones

USAC stock car race
USAC held a 250 lap USAC Stock Car race which it co-sanctioned with Automobile Racing Club of America (ARCA) on November 29, 1959. The race was shortened to 147 laps on account of darkness; Fred Lorenzen won the race after starting from the pole position. 16 of 35 starters finished the race.

USAC results

Fred Lorenzen
Mike Klapak
Harold Smith
Whitey Gerken
Bob Merritt
Wayne Weiler
Johnny Mantz
Bob Perry
Johnny Allen
Bob Duell
Dempsey Wilson
Jim Murphy
Chuck Webb
Cotton Farmer
Lou Fegers
Jimmy Davies

Demolition
The board decided to destroy the track. It divided the land into four parcels and it is occupied by the Westgate Las Vegas, Las Vegas Convention Center, and part of the Las Vegas Country Club.

References

NASCAR tracks
Sports venues in Las Vegas
Motorsport venues in Nevada
Defunct horse racing venues in the United States
Defunct sports venues in Nevada
Defunct motorsport venues in the United States
1953 establishments in Nevada
1955 disestablishments in Nevada